Mariya Polyakova (born 7 April 1974) is a former Ukrainian volleyball player.

She was part of the Ukraine women's national volleyball team at the 1996 Summer Olympics, and the 1994 FIVB Volleyball Women's World Championship. On club level she played with Olexandria Bila.

Clubs
 Olexandria Bila (1994)

References

External links
 
 
 
 https://web.archive.org/web/20171109090203/http://www.volleyball.org/olympics/rosters_indoor_women.html

1974 births
Living people
Ukrainian women's volleyball players
Olympic volleyball players of Ukraine
Volleyball players at the 1996 Summer Olympics
Place of birth missing (living people)